The Opposites of Light is Die So Fluid's fourth full-length album. It was released in the United Kingdom on 5 May 2014, on Vorvolaka Records.

The album was recorded at a variety of studios, both in London, UK and Hollywood, USA.

The album is split into two distinct sections ‘Shakura’ and ‘Pah’, the Solar and Lunar deities of the matriarchal Pawnee Native Americans.

Track listing
Music by Drew Richards, melody & lyrics by Grog Lisee, except where stated.

Personnel
Die So Fluid
 Grog – vocals, bass
 Drew "Mr Drew" Richards – guitar, string arrangements except 'Violent Delights'
 Al Fletcher – drums
Additional performers
 Samy Bishai - violin, string arrangements on 'Violent Delights'
 Ivan Hussey - cello
Production
 Die So Fluid - producer
 Adie Hardy - engineer
 Ed Woods - mastering
 Shelley Hannan - design & layout
 Tina Korhonen - photography
 Lee Thompson - photography
 David Kenny - photography

References

External links
 Album Review by Sonic Abuse, 12 October 2014
 Album Review by Uber Rock, 3 May 2014
 Album Review by Screamer Magazine, 28 May 2014
 Album Review by Battle Helm, 4 May 2014

2014 albums
Die So Fluid albums